Calera is a city in Shelby and Chilton counties in the U.S. state of Alabama. It is the location of the Shelby County Airport.

As of the 2010 census Calera had a population of 11,620, more than tripling its total in 2000, making it the fastest-growing city in Alabama. It is within the Birmingham-Hoover, Alabama Metropolitan Statistical Area.

Geography
Calera is located in southern Shelby County and the city limits extend southward into Chilton County along U.S. Route 31, the main highway through the city. Interstate 65 passes through the eastern side of the city, with access from exits 228, 231, and 234. Birmingham is 34 mi (55 km) north, and Montgomery is 59 mi (95 km) south, both via I-65.

History
The city of Calera was incorporated in 1887, and named after the Spanish word for "quarry" for all of the limestone deposits located in the area.

Demographics

2000 census
As of the census of 2000, there were 3,158 people, 1,248 households, and 888 families living in the city. The racial makeup of the city was 77.42% White, 19.92% Black or African American, 0.19% Native American, 0.54% Asian, 0.06% Pacific Islander, 0.66% from other races, and 1.20% from two or more races. 1.90% of the population were Hispanic or Latino of any race.

Of the 1,248 households 33.0% had children under the age of 18 living with them, 54.1% were married couples living together, 13.5% had a female householder with no husband present, and 28.8% were non-families. 26.4% of households were one person and 10.8% were one person aged 65 or older. The average household size was 2.51 and the average family size was 3.04.

The age distribution was 26.7% under the age of 18, 8.2% from 18 to 24, 31.7% from 25 to 44, 20.9% from 45 to 64, and 12.5% 65 or older. The median age was 34 years. For every 100 females, there were 93.0 males. For every 100 females age 18 and over, there were 85.0 males.

The median household income was $35,650 and the median family income  was $42,885. Males had a median income of $34,042 versus $21,750 for females. The per capita income for the city was $16,395. About 12.2% of families and 12.5% of the population were below the poverty line, including 15.8% of those under age 18 and 3.2% of those age 65 or over.

2010 census
As of the census of 2010, there were 11,620 people, 4,657 households, and 3,240 families living in the city. The racial makeup of the city was 71.2% White, 23.0% Black or African American, 0.2% Native American, 0.6% Asian, 0% Pacific Islander, 2.9% from other races, and 2.0% from two or more races. 5.0% of the population were Hispanic or Latino of any race.

Of the 4,657 households 35.4% had children under the age of 18 living with them, 53.8% were married couples living together, 12.3% had a female householder with no husband present, and 30.4% were non-families. 25.9% of households were one person and 5.2% were one person aged 65 or older. The average household size was 2.49 and the average family size was 3.01.

The age distribution was 26.5% under the age of 18, 7.4% from 18 to 24, 39.5% from 25 to 44, 18.5% from 45 to 64, and 8.0% 65 or older. The median age was 31.9 years. For every 100 females, there were 92.0 males. For every 100 females age 18 and over, there were 87.7 males.

The median household income was $54,080 and the median family income  was $62,117. Males had a median income of $47,125 versus $37,888 for females. The per capita income for the city was $24,391. About 9.6% of families and 12.6% of the population were below the poverty line, including 18.9% of those under age 18 and 7.8% of those age 65 or over.

2020 census

As of the 2020 United States census, there were 16,494 people, 5,100 households, and 3,469 families residing in the city.

Notable people
 Shanavia Dowdell, professional basketball player
Hut Stricklin, NASCAR driver
Virgil Trucks, Major League Baseball pitcher

Points of interest
Shelby County Airport
Heart of Dixie Railroad Museum
George Roy Park
Oliver Park
Timberline Golf Course
Calera Presbyterian Church

Gallery

Climate
The climate in this area is characterized by hot, humid summers and generally mild to cool winters.  According to the Köppen Climate Classification system, Calera has a humid subtropical climate, abbreviated "Cfa" on climate maps.  Calera is the location of the National Weather Service forecast office that serves the Birmingham metropolitan area.

References

External links
 City of Calera official website

Cities in Alabama
Cities in Chilton County, Alabama
Cities in Shelby County, Alabama
Populated places established in 1887
Birmingham metropolitan area, Alabama
1887 establishments in Alabama